Ernest George Cottreau (January 28, 1914 – March 7, 2004) was a Canadian businessman and educator. From 1974 until his retirement in 1989, he represented South Western Nova, Nova Scotia in the Senate of Canada.

Early life and education
He was born in Wedgeport, Nova Scotia, the son of George and Emilie (LeBlanc) Cottreau. In 1937, he graduated cum laude from Université Sainte-Anne, after studying philosophy and classics. He continued with post graduate studies in French and education, and taught at the university for several years after his graduation.

Career
Cottreau was a professor at Université Sainte-Anne in Nova Scotia, owner of an automobile dealership, Baker Motors, for fifteen years, a school principal, and served as president of the province's Liberal association in 1955.

Appointment to the Senate
In 1974, he was named to the Senate of Canada by Pierre Trudeau and retired upon reaching the mandatory retirement age of 75 in 1989.

Death
He died at the age of 90 in Yarmouth, Nova Scotia.

References

External links
 

1914 births
2004 deaths
Canadian senators from Nova Scotia
Liberal Party of Canada senators
People from Yarmouth, Nova Scotia